Alfred Garneau (December 20, 1836–1904) was a poet who was born in Quebec, Canada. His father was François-Xavier Garneau.

Garneau's Life
Alfred was the eldest son of François-Xavier Garneau (1809-1866). Alfred was a well-educated young boy, who went to a seminary and was called in 1860. After the seminary, he then studied to become a lawyer. In 1861 he joined the Canadian civil service, and was appointed to Chief French Translator for the Senate of Canada in 1873.

His grandson Hector de Saint-Denys Garneau (1912-1943) was a poet and painter.

Garneau's Works

Alfred Garneau's works include the Le Foyer Canadien, Histoire du Canada, and Poésies. Alfred worked on these articles as an editor and as an author, some say he had co-written these books, while others say he had others write for him.

References

1836 births
1904 deaths
19th-century Canadian poets
Canadian male poets
Writers from Quebec
Canadian poets in French
19th-century Canadian male writers